Raleigh–Durham International Airport , locally known by its IATA code RDU, is an international airport that serves Raleigh, Durham, and the surrounding Research Triangle region of North Carolina as its main airport. It is located in unincorporated Wake County, but is surrounded by the City of Raleigh to the North and East, and the towns of Cary and Morrisville to the South.

In 2022, RDU offered passenger service to more than 50 domestic destinations and 6 international destinations with more than 500 average daily aircraft movements. The RDU Airport Authority is in charge of the airport facilities and operations and is controlled by a board of representatives from the counties of Wake and Durham and the cities of Raleigh and Durham.

Raleigh-Durham International Airport is the second-largest airport in the state of North Carolina, behind Charlotte-Douglas International Airport. It is a focus city for Avelo Airlines and Delta Air Lines, the latter operating international routes (i.e. Paris Charles-de-Gaulle).

History

Founding

It was quickly outgrown, and in 1939 the North Carolina General Assembly chartered the Raleigh–Durham Aeronautical Authority to build and operate a larger airport between Raleigh and Durham. This was promoted by Eastern Air Lines, led by then chairman Eddie Rickenbacker, who wanted to make RDU a stop on the airline's New York–Miami route.

The new Raleigh–Durham Airport opened on May 1, 1943, with flights by Eastern Airlines. The passenger terminal was built from materials remaining after the construction of four barracks for the Army Air Forces Air Technical Service Command airfield. The three runways the airport had in 1951 are still visible on the southeast side of the airport: 4500-ft runway 5, 4500-ft runway 18 and 4490-ft runway 14.

After World War II, Capital Airlines joined Eastern at RDU; Piedmont Airlines arrived in 1948. The April 1957 Official Airline Guide shows 36 departures a day: twenty Eastern, eight Capital and eight Piedmont. Nonstop flights did not reach beyond Washington, Atlanta, or the Appalachians (but Eastern started a Super Constellation nonstop to Newark in 1958). The next airline (aside from United's takeover of Capital in 1961) was Delta Air Lines in 1970. In April 1969, nonstops didn't reach beyond New York or Atlanta, and Chicago was the only nonstop west of the Appalachians. RDU's first scheduled jets were Eastern 727s in 1965.

In the 1970s, the last decade before airline deregulation, Piedmont connected RDU to Charlotte, Greensboro, New Bern, Norfolk, Richmond, Rocky Mount, Washington, Wilmington and Winston-Salem. United flew to Asheville, Charlotte, Huntsville and Newark, while Eastern flew to Atlanta, Charlotte, Miami, New York, Philadelphia, Richmond and Washington, and Delta flew to Chicago and Greensboro.

After deregulation, Allegheny Airlines arrived in 1979, and by 1985 Trans World Airlines, American Airlines, Ozark, People Express, New York Air and Pan Am had all put in appearances.

Hub years
American built a terminal at RDU between 1985 and 1987 to house a new hub, and flew to 38 cities when the hub started in June 1987. The December 1987 timetable shows AA nonstops to 36 airports and American Eagle prop nonstops to 18 more. American later flew to London-Gatwick and Paris-Orly. The RDU hub operated at a loss even during its heyday in the early 1990s, like the hub AA then had at Nashville. American's December 1992 timetable, around the time of the hub's peak, showed 211 daily departures to 64 destinations, almost all in the eastern United States (the westernmost destinations being American's hubs at Dallas/Fort Worth and Chicago–O'Hare). The hub faced intense competition from Delta and Eastern in Atlanta and from USAir in Charlotte, as well as the short-lived Continental hub in Greensboro that opened in 1993. American began to consider closing the hub in late 1993; operations were reduced until June 1995 when American closed the hub.

American retained a daily nonstop flight to London, which continued to operate until the COVID-19 pandemic and resumed in 2022. The RDU-London route was originally launched based on a purchasing commitment from GlaxoSmithKline, which has major offices at both ends of the route; however, the route is no longer dependent on GSK for revenue.

Midway Airlines replaced AA as the airport's hub carrier from 1995 until 2003. In 1995, Midway had flights to Boston, Hartford, Long Island, Newark, Newburgh, New York, Philadelphia and Washington in the Northeast, and to Fort Lauderdale, Jacksonville, Orlando, Tampa and West Palm Beach in Florida. American subleased its gates at RDU to Midway in order to repay $113 million in American-guaranteed bonds which had been used to construct the hub facilities. Midway suspended service for some time after the September 11, 2001 attacks, and ceased operations in 2002, filing for bankruptcy in 2003.

Recent history

RDU's post-hub years have brought the addition of new carriers and destinations, notably 
discount carriers such as Allegiant Air, Southwest Airlines and Frontier Airlines. Because of the economic downturn and high fuel prices in 2008, American ended most point to point flights it operated out of the airport. Several mainline flights were also dropped and service to other cities was reduced or downgraded. Other airlines also cut flights and destinations including United Airlines and US Airways. Also in 2008, the airport was modernized; the current rebuilt Terminal 2 opened, on the site of the old Terminal C that was built in 1987. The rebuilt was completed in 2011, and was designed by Fentress Architects.

By 2010, RDU's traffic began to recover. In the first few months of the year, passenger numbers stabilized at RDU, ending the decrease the airport experienced in 2008 and 2009. In the first four months of 2010, 2.7 million passengers traveled through RDU. Growth was flat compared to the same period a year before, but these signs were positive indicating that the decline was over. Airlines at RDU began to add new services to the schedule with both legacy and low-cost carriers significantly increasing service since the early 2010s.

Delta Air Lines maintains a focus city operation at RDU, which it decided to maintain in the wake of the COVID-19 pandemic due to the area's strong economy and lack of a dominant network carrier. The airline still maintains the Raleigh-Paris route, flying four times a week using a Boeing 767-300. This route is to be upgraded to a Boeing 767-400ER in the end of March 2023.

In November 2022, Avelo Airlines announced the opening of an operating base at Raleigh-Durham. The airline anticipates to have as many as 7 aircraft in the first 2 years and 50 crew members in the first year based at RDU. In a route announcement in March 2023, the airline announced a second aircraft was coming to RDU, as well as 35 additional jobs.

Future
The RDU Airport Authority released its Vision 2040 Master Plan in 2017 detailing the improvements which will be made by 2040. The major projects are the construction of a consolidated rental car facility, an on-site hotel, expansion of parking lots, expansion of both terminals to add gates, improvements to the taxiway layout, and the complete rebuilding of the runways. The proposal included lengthening runway 5R/23L to 9,000 feet and rebuilding runway 5L/23R to a length of 11,500 feet just northwest of its current position. The existing runway 5L/23R would become a taxiway for the new runway. Despite these plans, the FAA requested to shorten the length of runway 5L/23R to 10,000 feet because of the impact of COVID-19 on the aviation industry. The FAA ultimately approved rebuilding runway 5L/23R at 10,639 feet, allowing airlines to carry more passengers and cargo, but not allowing the desired traffic to Asia.

Facilities

Terminals
The airport contains two terminals with a total of 45 gates. The two terminals do not have an airside connection; passengers moving between the terminals may ride a shuttle bus or take the moving walkway through the covered parking decks between the terminals. All non-pre–cleared international flights are processed in Terminal 2.

Terminal 1 contains 9 gates.
Terminal 2 contains 36 gates.

Cargo areas
The airport incorporates two cargo areas, North Cargo and South Cargo. The North Cargo terminal area is used by cargo airlines. The largest cargo operators are FedEx and UPS. The South Cargo terminal area is used by commercial airlines for cargo operations.

Airlines and destinations

Passenger

Cargo

Statistics

Top domestic destinations

Annual traffic

Airline market share

Accidents and incidents
On January 2, 1953, a USAF Douglas C-47 crashed near RDU attempting to land with rain and low visibility after diverting from Pope AFB in Fayetteville. The aircraft crashed nearly two miles south of the airport in Crabtree Park. Three out of the four occupants died.
On Wednesday, November 12, 1975, Eastern Air Lines flight 576, a Boeing 727-225, crashed while attempting to land on runway 23 (now runway 23 Left). The aircraft hit the ground 282 feet short of the runway and bounced back into the air before coming down on the runway and sliding 4,150 feet down the runway, stopping where the south end of Terminal 1 is today. Of the 139 persons on the flight, eight were injured, one seriously. The NTSB investigation initially blamed the crash on "the pilot's failure to execute a missed approach when he lost sight of the runway environment in heavy rain below decision height." The accident report and probable cause were later revised to include the influence of undetected wind shear. The aircraft (Boeing 727-225, N8838E) sustained major damage and was moved to an area on the north end of closed runway 18. A temporary structure was built around the aircraft which was eventually repaired and returned to service.
On February 19, 1988, AVAir Flight 3378, a Fairchild Swearingen Metroliner was on a regularly scheduled flight between Raleigh and Richmond operating for American Eagle when it crashed into a reservoir about a mile from the airport in the vicinity of Cary. The aircraft had departed during low ceiling, low visibility and night conditions. Analysis of radar data indicated the aircraft was in a 45-degree descending turn. Both crew members and all 10 passengers were killed. It was revealed during the investigation that the pilot had complained of illness but decided to continue the flight.
 On December 13, 1994, American Eagle Flight 3379 operated by AMR's regional airline Flagship Airlines, a Jetstream 31 was on a regularly scheduled service of Raleigh–Greensboro–Raleigh when it crashed into a wooded area about  SW of the airport, in the vicinity of Morrisville. Of the 20 onboard (18 passengers and two crewmembers) 15 were killed while the five survivors received serious injuries. The probable cause of the crash was the pilot not following proper procedure when it came to an engine failure situation.
On July 31, 2000, a Win Win Aviation de Havilland Canada DHC-6 Twin Otter crashed on approach nearly two miles SSW of RDU on a positioning flight due to fog and darkness. The pilot was not instrument rated to fly in bad weather. One crewmember out of the three occupants died.
On October 20, 2019, a Piper PA-32 crashed in a wooded area of Umstead State Park on approach to runway 32. Both occupants of the plane died.
On January 21, 2022, a Bombardier CRJ-900 operated by Endeavor Air on behalf of Delta Connection from Ronald Reagan Washington National Airport slid off the taxiway while exiting runway 05L during a winter storm. 19 passengers and crew were on board and no injuries were reported.
On July 29, 2022, a CASA C-212 Aviocar from Raeford West Airport made an emergency landing and subsequently slid off runway 23L due to its lack of right landing gear. On approach, the 23-year old co-pilot, Charles Hew Crooks, exited the plane over Fuquay-Varina and subsequently died. The pilot was transported to the hospital with minor injuries as the result of a rough landing.

See also

 List of airports in North Carolina
 List of the busiest airports in the United States
 North Carolina World War II Army Airfields

References

External links

 Raleigh–Durham International Airport
 RDU Aircraft Noise Program
 RDU Parking
  at North Carolina DOT airport guide
 
 

Airports in North Carolina
Transportation in Raleigh, North Carolina
Airfields of the United States Army Air Forces Technical Service Command
Buildings and structures in Wake County, North Carolina
Airfields of the United States Army Air Forces in North Carolina
Transportation in Wake County, North Carolina
Transportation in Durham, North Carolina
Airports established in 1943
1943 establishments in North Carolina